Sir Thomas Butler, 3rd Baronet of Cloughgrenan (a townland near Carlow), (died c. February 1704) was an Irish baronet and politician.

He was the son of Sir Edmund Butler, 2nd Baronet and Juliana Hyde, daughter of Bernard Hyde. By 1650, he succeeded his father as baronet. In 1670 and again in 1691, Butler was High Sheriff of Carlow. From 1692 until his death, he sat for Carlow County in the Irish House of Commons.

Marriage and issue
Butler married firstly Jane Boyle, daughter of the Right Reverend Richard Boyle, Bishop of Leighlin and Ferns, and secondly Jane Pottinger, daughter of Captain Edward Pottinger and widow of John Reynolds, in July 1700. By his first wife, he had two sons. Pierce, the oldest of them, was a Member of Parliament for the same constituency his father had represented and succeeded to the baronetcy.

See also
 Butler dynasty

References

1704 deaths
Thomas
Politicians from County Carlow
Irish MPs 1692–1693
Irish MPs 1695–1699
Irish MPs 1703–1713
Members of the Parliament of Ireland (pre-1801) for County Carlow constituencies
High Sheriffs of Carlow
Baronets in the Baronetage of Ireland
Year of birth missing
Butler baronets, of Cloughgrenan